Amlak-e Galikash (also Romanized as Āmlāḵ-e Gālīḵash; also known as Amlāk) is a village in Yanqaq Rural District in the Central District of Galikash County, Golestan Province, Iran. At the 2006 census, its population was 480, in 104 families.

References 

Populated places in Galikash County